Lucanus mazama is a beetle of the family Lucanidae. Its common name is the cottonwood stag beetle. It is considered "scaraboid" but is not necessarily confined to deserts. They are often found in the wood chip ground covering at playgrounds. It is located primarily in the western and southwestern United States.

References

mazama
Fauna of the Southwestern United States
Beetles described in 1861